Most Iapetian geological features are named after characters and locations in the Old French epic poem The Song of Roland, specifically the English translation by Dorothy L. Sayers.

Montes
A mons , pl. montes , is a mountain.

Regiones

There is one named Iapetian regio  (area of distinct albedo difference), Cassini:

Terrae

There are two named Iapetian terrae  (large 'land' masses).

The adjectival form of Roncevaux is Roncesvallian.

Craters

Named impact craters are:

References

 Mackey & Mackey, 1922, The Pronunciation of 10,000 Proper Names, Dodd, Mead & Co., New York

External links

 USGS: Iapetus nomenclature
 JPL: Iapetus Global Maps

 
Iapetus